Matterson Inlet is an ice-filled inlet between Penny Point and Cape Douglas, on the west side of the Ross Ice Shelf, Antarctica. It was named by the New Zealand Geological Survey Antarctic Expedition (1960–61) for Garth John Matterson, leader of the party that surveyed the area.

References

Inlets of Antarctica
Shackleton Coast